Lone Star Park  is a horse racing track and entertainment destination located  mile north of Interstate 30 on Belt Line Road in Grand Prairie, Texas.  Lone Star Park has two live racing seasons every year; the spring Thoroughbred season generally runs from early April through mid-July, and the Fall Meeting of Champions generally runs from early September through mid-November.

History

In 1992 Grand Prairie voters approved a half-cent sales tax to assist in financial bonds to build a racetrack. Shortly thereafter, the city created a sports authority (the Grand Prairie Sports Facilities Development Corp.), which would own the track and lease it to a track operator.

Physical attributes
The track has a one-mile (1.6 km) dirt oval and a seven-furlong turf track, and has accommodations for 1,600 horses across 32 barns. The climate-controlled grandstand has a seating capacity of roughly 8,000 people.

Personalities
Dave Appleton, paddock host (1997–present)
Rick Lee, track Handicapper (1998–present)
Jim Byers, track announcer (2016–present)

Production staff
John Marsh, video production manager

Racing 

Due to the popularity of many different horse breeds in the state of Texas, half of the races are set up for more than just thoroughbreds.

Graded events
Thoroughbred races:
Grade III
Steve Sexton Mile Stakes – $300,000 guaranteed – 3 yo & up | 1 mile

Quarter horse:

Grade I
Texas Classic Futurity  – $1,000,000 estimated – 2 yo | 400 yards
Texas Classic Derby  – $400,000 estimated – 3 yo | 440 yards
Refrigerator Handicap  – $75,000-Guaranteed – 3 yo & up | 440 yards
Grade II
Dash For Cash Futurity – $450,000 estimated – 2 yo | 400 yards
Grade III
Dash For Cash Derby  – $175,000 estimated – 3 yo | 440 yards
B. F. Phillips Jr. Stakes Restricted Texas-Bred – $25,000 guaranteed – 3 yo & up | 400 yards

Paint and Appaloosa:

Grade I
Speedhorse Lone Star Paint and Appaloosa Futurity – $100,000 estimated – 2 yo | 400 yards

Other events

Assault Stakes – Restricted Texas-Bred – $50,000 guaranteed – 3 yo & up | 1 mile
Bluebonnet Stakes – Restricted Texas-Bred – $50,000 guaranteed – 3 yo & up |  furlongs
Wayne Hanks Memorial Stakes – Restricted Texas-Bred – $50,000 guaranteed – fillies & mares, 3 yo & up |  furlongs
Texas Stallion Stakes (Got Koko Division) – $65,000 guaranteed – fillies, 3 yo | 1 mile
Texas Stallion Stakes (Stymie Division) – $65,000 guaranteed – colts & geldings, 3 yo | 1 mile
Nevill Stakes – Restricted Texas-Bred – $20,000 estimated – 3 yo & up | 350 yards

Masterpiece Challenge Paint and Appaloosa Stakes – Listed – $20,000 estimated – 3 yo | 400 yards

Arabians:

Dubai International Arabian Races Texas Open Stakes – $30,000 guaranteed – 3 yo & up | 1 & 1/16 mile
Shadwell Arabian Stallions Texas Distaff Stakes – $30,000 guaranteed – fillies & mares, 3 yo & up  | 8 furlongs
www.shadwellarabian.co.uk Texas Lone Star Futurity – $20,000 guaranteed – fillies, 3 yo | 6 furlongs
DIAR Texas Lone Star Futurity – $20,000 guaranteed – colts & geldings, 3 yo | 6 furlongs

References

Map: 

 
Buildings and structures in Dallas County, Texas
Buildings and structures in Grand Prairie, Texas
Horse racing venues in Texas
Stronach Group
Sports in the Dallas–Fort Worth metroplex
Sports venues in Texas
Tourist attractions in Dallas County, Texas
Sports in Grand Prairie, Texas
1997 establishments in Texas